Hemerocallis middendorffii var. esculenta (synonym Hemerocallis esculenta) known as nikkōkisuge or zenteika (in Japanese: 日光黄菅 or 禅庭花) is a perennial plant belonging to the family Asphodelaceae. It is native to Japan. Its yellow flower blooms in early summer, especially in the highlands of Japan in large groups.

Distribution
Some of the places where nikkōkisuge grows include:
 Kirifuri Highland, Nikkō, Tochigi Prefecture
 Numappara Shitsugen (Wetland), Nasushiobara, Tochigi Prefecture
 Lake Oguni, Fukushima Prefecture
 Lake Nozori, Gunma Prefecture
 Ozegahara, in Gunnma Prefecture, Nagano Prefecture and Niigata Prefecture Prefectures

References

middendorffii var. esculenta
Endemic flora of Japan